Elliott David Simpson (born 1 July 1976) is an English former footballer who played as a defender. He played for York City, Rowntree, Pickering Town, Gainsborough Trinity and Harrogate Railway Athletic.

Career
Born in York, North Yorkshire, Simpson started his career with the York City youth system on a Youth Training Scheme. He was a member of the York youth team that reached the quarter-final of the FA Youth Cup in the 1992–93 season, in which York were beaten 5–0 away at Manchester United. Simpson made his first team debut after starting in a 2–1 victory at home to Brentford in the Second Division on 13 September 1994 and was released by the club in May 1995 having failed to make another appearance. He dropped into non-League football after signing for Rowntree in August 1995. This was followed by spells with Pickering Town and Gainsborough Trinity before returning to Rowntree and finishing his career with Harrogate Railway Athletic.

Style of play
Simpson played as a left winger for York's youth team before being converted into a left back.

Career statistics

Footnotes

References

1976 births
Living people
Footballers from York
English footballers
Association football defenders
York City F.C. players
Nestlé Rowntree F.C. players
Pickering Town F.C. players
Gainsborough Trinity F.C. players
Harrogate Railway Athletic F.C. players
English Football League players